Assault on Agathon is a 1975 drama film directed by László Benedek and starring Nico Minardos, Nina van Pallandt, Marianne Faithfull and John Woodvine. It is based on a novel by Alan Caillou.

Premise
Cabot Cain is a Western secret agent assigned to stop the mysterious Agathon, an ex-World War II revolutionary, who is committing terrorist acts in Greece and Albania.

Production
Nico Minardos obtained financing for the film from Kjell Qvale, a Bay Area-based automotive entrepreneur who was then the majority shareholder in Jensen Motors.  Minardos had approached Qvale for a product placement deal to use a Jensen Interceptor during filming but ultimately convinced Qvale to finance the entire movie.

References

External links
 

1975 films
1975 drama films
Metro-Goldwyn-Mayer films
Films based on British novels
Films set in Greece
Films set in Albania
Films directed by László Benedek
American drama films
Films scored by Ken Thorne
1970s English-language films
1970s American films